Magar Dhut is a Sino-Tibetan Language spoken mainly in Nepal, Southern Bhutan, and in Darjeeling and Sikkim, India, by the Magar people. It is divided into two groups (Eastern and Western) and further dialect divisions give distinct tribal identity. In Nepal 788,530 people speak the language.

While the government of Nepal developed Magar language curricula, as provisioned by the constitution, the teaching materials have never successfully reached Magar schools, where most school instruction is in the Nepali language. It is not unusual for groups with their own language to feel that the "mother-tongue" is an essential part of identity.

The Dhut Magar language is sometimes lumped with the Magar Kham language spoken further west in Bheri, Dhaulagiri, and Rapti zones. Although the two languages share many common words, they have major structural differences and are not mutually intelligible.

Geographical distribution

Western Magar 
Western Magar (dialects: Palpa and Syangja) is spoken in the following districts of Nepal (Ethnologue).
 Lumbini Province: Palpa District
 Gandaki Province: Syangja District, and Tanahu District
 Small border area in Gandaki Province: Parbat District
 Scattered throughout Karnali Province: especially in Surkhet District, Jajarkot District, and Dailekh District

Eastern Magar 
Eastern Magar (dialects: Gorkha, Nawalparasi, and Tanahu) is spoken in the following districts of Nepal (Ethnologue).
 Zone 1: central mountains of Nepal east of the Bagmati River
 Gandaki Province: Tanahu District and southern Gorkha District
 Lumbini Province: Palpa District Kapilvastu District and Nawalparasi District
 Small border area in Bagmati Province: Dhading District
 Zone 2: eastern Nepal
 Sindhuli District, Bagmati Province
 Okhaldhunga District, Koshi Province
 Udayapur District, Koshi Province
 Scattered communities in central Koshi Province, Dhankuta District, Bhojpur and southern Koshi Province, Ilam District, Jhapa District
 Some areas in India: Sikkim, Darjeeling, Assam, Manipur 
 Southern Bhutan

Phonology

Consonants 

*-only occur in the Tanahu dialect.

 is only a marginal phoneme.

Vowels

References

Further reading

 Shepherd, Gary, and Barbara Shepherd. A Vocabulary of the Magar Language. Comparative vocabularies of languages of Nepal. Kirtipur: Summer Institute of Linguistics [and] Institute of Nepal Studies, Tribhuvan University, 1972.
 Shepherd, Gary, and Barbara Shepherd. Magar Phonemic Summary. Tibeto-Burman phonemic summaries, 8. Kirtipur: Summer Institute of Linguistics, Tribhuvan University, 1971.

External links

detailed language map, western Nepal.  Eastern Magar is language #33; Western Magar is #113.
ELAR archive of Magar language documentation materials
The Magar language - Linguistics research - Folktales in Magar (Western) - Nepal

Languages of India
Languages of Nepal
Languages of Sikkim
Magaric languages
Languages of Koshi Province
Languages of Gandaki Province
Languages of Lumbini Province
Languages of Sudurpashchim Province